João Manuel (Lisbon, c. 1416 – December 1476) was a religious Carmelite, Bishop of Ceuta (1443-1459) and Bishop of Guarda (1459-1476). Although some genealogists claimed that he was the son of  Edward, King of Portugal  and Joana Manuel de Vilhena, great-granddaughter of Juan Manuel, Prince of Villena, Anselmo Braamcamp Freire dismisses such filiation and provides sufficient arguments against it.

João Manuel joined the Carmelites in 1441 to become provincial of the Order in Portugal. He was made titular Bishop of Tiberias at the same time by Pope Eugene IV. He was also the ambassador to Hungary. In 1443, he was appointed Bishop of Ceuta and primate of Africa. In 1450, he became chaplain to King Afonso V of Portugal.  Finally, in 1459, he was appointed Bishop of Guarda, a town in which he never actually lived.

From a relationship he had with a Justa Rodrigues, he had two sons, who served Alfonso V and John II of Portugal during their reigns: João Manuel (1466-1500), mayor of Santarém, and Nuno Manuel (1469- after 1500), Lord of Salvaterra de Magos.

He is buried at the Carmo Church located at the Carmo Convent, a medieval convent later ruined in the 1755 Lisbon earthquake.

References

Bibliography 

1416 births
1476 deaths
15th-century Roman Catholic bishops in Portugal
Bishops of Ceuta
Bishops of Guarda
Carmelites
Clergy from Lisbon